The terpsitone was an electronic musical instrument, invented by Léon Theremin, which consisted of a platform fitted with space-controlling antennae, through and around which a dancer would control the musical performance. By most accounts, the instrument was nearly impossible to control. Of the three instruments built, only the last one, made by Theremin in 1978 for Lydia Kavina, survives today. The instrument was named after the Greek muse of dance, Terpsichore (from the Greek words τέρπω, "delight", and χoρός, "dance").

See also
Theremin

References
Mason, C. P. (1936). Theremin "Terpsitone" A New Electronic Novelty in Radio Craft, Dec. 1936, p.365
Saggini, Valerio (2004). The Last Terpsitone on Earth

Inventions by Léon Theremin
Electronic musical instruments
Continuous pitch instruments
Russian electronic musical instruments